Kielce Power Station is a coal-fired combined power and heat plant at Kielce, Poland.  It went operational in 1987 and consists of one 140 MW unit, six 25 MW units and one 10 MW cogeneration unit. It is operated by PGE.

FM- and TV-broadcasting.

See also 

 List of tallest structures in Poland
 List of power stations in Poland

External links 
 http://radiopolska.pl/wykaz/pokaz_lokalizacja.php?pid=238
 http://www.sat-charts.eu/nadajnik,47KielceKominEC.html
 http://www.dvbtmap.eu/mapcoverage.html?chid=9668

Energy infrastructure completed in 1987
Towers completed in 1987
Power Station
Coal-fired power stations in Poland
Cogeneration power stations in Poland